The George Leatherbury House was a historic house along the shore of Portersville Bay, halfway between Bayou La Batre and Bayou Coden, in southern Mobile County, Alabama.

Description and history 
It was built in 1912 by George Scarborough Leatherbury in the local "Bay house" style.  Leatherbury owned several lumber companies in Mississippi and operated a naval stores company. The house was added to the National Register of Historic Places on June 14, 1990. It was subsequently destroyed on August 29, 2005, by an estimated record-level  storm surge generated by Hurricane Katrina.

References

External links
Photos of Hurricane Katrina damage along Coden's Shell Belt Road

Houses on the National Register of Historic Places in Alabama
Houses completed in 1912
National Register of Historic Places in Mobile County, Alabama
Houses in Mobile County, Alabama
Demolished buildings and structures in Alabama
1912 establishments in Alabama